Olasunkanmi Rehanat Alonge (born 2 June 1987), better known by her stage name Sunkanmi, is a Nigerian songwriter and singer; Sunkanmi rose to recognition in 2015 when she released "For Body", a song which had her enlisting the collaborative effort of a popular Nigerian musician by name Olamide. She is currently signed to Hit The Ground Records under which she has released numerous singles.

Early life and education
Sunkanmi is an alumna of Olabisi Onabanjo University, where she studied Geophysics.

Musical career
While in her second year in school, Sunkanmi had her first recording; in mid-2015, through the help of her producer, she got to meet Olamide. The meeting lead to the creation of a song titled For Body. Sunkanmi signed on with Hit The Ground Running Entertainment.

In 2015, Sunkanmi was nominated for the "Most Promising Act to Watch" at the 2015 edition of the Nigeria Entertainment Awards, and in 2016, she received 3 nominations from Scream All-Youth Awards in the "Best New Act" category, The Lagos Fashion Award in the "Fashionable Revelation Artist of the Year" category and Eloy Awards in the "Upcoming female Music Artiste" category, alongside the likes of Niniola, Falana and Aramide.

Discography

Singles
List of singles as lead artist, showing year released and album name

Music videos 
List of music videos as lead artist, showing date released and directors

Awards and nominations

References 

Living people
Yoruba women musicians
21st-century Nigerian women singers
Olabisi Onabanjo University alumni
Musicians from Lagos State
People from Ogun State
Yoruba-language singers
English-language singers from Nigeria
Nigerian women singer-songwriters
1987 births
Nigerian People's Party politicians